Earth and Fire is the first studio album by the Dutch rock and pop band Earth and Fire. Released in 1970, the album contains the first single "Seasons" written by Golden Earring singer and guitarist George Kooymans. Other singles released are "Ruby Is the One" and "Wild and Exciting".

The cover of the UK release was created by English artist Roger Dean.

Track listing
 Wild and Exciting (Chris and Gerard  Koerts) – 4:06
 Twilight Dreamer (C. Koerts) – 4:18
 Ruby Is the One (C. Koerts) – 3:28
 You know the Way (G. Koerts) – 3:48
 Vivid Shady Land (C. Koerts) – 4:13
 21st Century Show (C. Koerts) – 4:16
 Seasons (George Kooymans) – 4:09
 Love Quivers (C. and G. Koerts) – 7:37
 What's Your Name (C. and G. Koerts) – 3:38
 Hazy Paradise (bonus track) – 3:47
 Mechanical Lover (bonus track) – 2:15

Personnel
Jerney - lead vocals, electronics
Chris Koerts - guitar, backing vocals
Gerard Koerts - piano, organ
Hans Ziech - bass
Ton van de Kleij - drums, percussion
Roger Dean - design and artwork (UK release)

References

1970 albums